The Ann Arbor Summer Festival (A2SF) champions performing arts, outdoor entertainment, and community spirit. In addition to a nearly four-week festival each June that attracts a diverse audience of over 80,000 people and offers over 200 concerts, art exhibitions, kids activities, spectacle, and film screenings, A2SF presents the best in dance, contemporary circus, and comedy throughout the year.

History 
Founded by Eugene Power, and established as an equal partnership between the City of Ann Arbor and the University of Michigan, early seasons emphasized classical music and theater, but have since become more popular and diverse in nature, encompassing a breadth of performance genres. Today, the June festival offers two concurrent series. The outdoor centerpiece at Top of the Park offers admission-free concerts, movies, open-air spectacles, and unique family attractions held along a beautiful U-M campus green. The indoor, ticketed series features world-class music, dance, contemporary circus, and comedy.

A2SF continues to grow as a major year-round cultural leader in Washtenaw County and as an internationally recognized celebration of arts that enriches the cultural, economic, and social vitality of the region.

For nearly four decades, A2SF has hosted such luminaries as Ella Fitzgerald, Johnny Cash, Dave Brubeck, Ray Charles, Dizzy Gillespie, Marcel Marceau, Aretha Franklin, Tony Bennett, Mikhail Baryshnikov, Garrison Keillor, Willie Nelson, Elvis Costello, Gladys Knight, Chris Isaak, Bonnie Raitt, Diana Krall, Ingrid Michaelson, Michael Franti & Spearhead, Andrew Bird, Lily Tomlin, Circa, Steve Martin, Trombone Shorty, The Indigo Girls, John Waters, Melissa Etheridge, Postmodern Jukebox, Las Cafeteras, Gregory Allan Isakov, Bernadette Peters, Cake, Lyle Lovett, Momix, k.d. lang, Ira Glass, Buddy Guy, Feist, Mayer Hawthorne, John Hiatt, Taylor Mac, The Moth Mainstage, Ani Difranco, Meow Meow, Los Lobos, Diana Krall, Patty Griffin and Wait Wait, Don’t Tell Me!

In addition to its mainstream presentations and regional artists, outdoor spectacle installations and performance offerings have included Australia’s Strange Fruit, The Architects of Air, Transe Express, Wild bytes’ Superhero, The Dream Engine, Erth’s Dinosaurs, Close Act Theatre’s Saurus, Polyglot’s Tangle, The Water Balloon Gladiators, David Zinn, March Fourth!, and Mucca Pazza.

References

External links
Ann Arbor Summer Festival

Festivals in Michigan
Recurring events established in 1978
Culture of Ann Arbor, Michigan
Tourist attractions in Ann Arbor, Michigan
1978 establishments in Michigan